Trilegal (founded in 2000) is a law firm based in India. It has over 300 lawyers across four offices in Bangalore, Mumbai, New Delhi and Gurgaon. The firm provides services in areas of real estate, infrastructure, energy, technology and IT enabled services, M&A, capital markets, private equity, capital funds, corporate and commercial disputes, intellectual property, competition law and banking.

In the year 2007, Trilegal along with Linklaters advised Vodafone in relation to its multi-billion dollar ($11.1 billion) acquisition of a 67% stake in Hutchison Essar Ltd., a leading telecom company in India which is still one of the biggest M&A transactions in India.

In early 2008, Trilegal announced that it had entered into a non-financial relationship with Allen & Overy entailing client referrals, training, consultation and joint marketing in India, which was terminated in 2012.

References

Law firms established in 2000
Law firms of India
Legal organisations based in India